The Windtech Nitro is a Spanish single-place paraglider that was designed and produced by Windtech Parapentes of Gijón. It is now out of production.

Design and development
The aircraft was designed as a competition glider. The models are each named for their approximate wing area in square metres.

The design was optimized for glide ratio and maintenance of wing tip pressure to prevent collapses.

The glider wing is made from Porcher Marine Skytex 44 g/m2 nylon fabric. The rib reinforcements are 310 g/m2 Dacron, with the trailing edge reinforcement fabricated of 175 g/m2 polyester. The lines are all sheathed Kevlar of 1.1 and 1.7 mm diameter or, optionally 0.6 and 0.9 mm micro unsheathed lines. The risers are made from 20 mm wide Polyamida strapping.

Operational history
Reviewer Noel Bertrand praised the glider in a 2003 review, saying, "the flight qualities of the Nitro are explosive!"

Variants
Nitro 24
Small-sized model for lighter pilots. The glider model is not certified, but was load tested.
Nitro 26
Mid-sized model for medium-weight pilots. The glider model is not certified, but was load tested.
Nitro 28
Large-sized model for heavier pilots. The glider model is not certified, but was load tested.

Specifications (Nitro 26)

References

External links

Nitro
Paragliders